Burhanuddin Khan Jahangir (9 January 1936 – 23 March 2020) was a Bangladeshi academic and writer. He was awarded the Bangla Academy Literary Award in 1969 and the Ekushey Padak in 2009.

Education
Jahangir completed his matriculation exam in 1950 from Muslim Government High School, Dhaka and intermediate exam in 1952 from Dhaka College. He obtained his bachelors and masters in political science from the University of Dhaka in 1955 and 1956 respectively. He got his Ph.D. from Durham University in 1974.

Career
Jahangir started his career at the University of Dhaka as a lecturer in 1956 and retired in 1994.

Awards 

 Ekushey Padak (2009)
 Bangla Academy Literary Award (1969)
 Fruit of Honor by UNESCO and French Government 
 Muzaffar Ahmed Memorial Award, Kolkata (20)
 Twenty-one medals in education and research (23).

Death 
Jahangir died at his residence in Gulshan, Dhaka on 23 March 2020 and was buried on 24 March at his family's graveyard at Kachua upazila of Chandpur District.

References

1936 births
2020 deaths
People from Chandpur District
Dhaka College alumni
University of Dhaka alumni
Academic staff of the University of Dhaka
Alumni of Durham University
Bangladeshi male writers
Recipients of Bangla Academy Award
Recipients of the Ekushey Padak